Ptilodexia is a genus of bristle flies in the family Tachinidae.

Species

References

Dexiinae
Taxa named by Friedrich Moritz Brauer
Taxa named by Julius von Bergenstamm
Diptera of South America
Diptera of North America
Tachinidae genera